Kepler-24 is a star in the northern constellation of Lyra. It is located at the celestial coordinates: Right Ascension , Declination . With an apparent visual magnitude of 15.5, this star is too faint to be seen with the naked eye.

Planetary system
Two planetary candidates b and c were discovered in 2011, and were confirmed in 2012 together with d and e.

References

 
Lyra (constellation)
G-type main-sequence stars
1102
Planetary transit variables
Planetary systems with four confirmed planets
J19213918+3820375